Milichius is a bowl-shaped lunar impact crater that is located in the northern part of the Mare Insularum. To the southeast is the slightly larger Hortensius, a similar formation.
Further away due east of Milichius is the prominent and well-known Copernicus.

Further away due east of Milichius is the prominent and well-known Copernicus.

The crater is named after 16th century German doctor, mathematician and astronomer Jacob Milich, Latinized as Milichius.

Just to the west is a typical lunar dome designated Milichius Pi (π) that has a tiny craterlet at the peak. The narrow and sinuous Rima Milichius rille is located farther to the southwest, and follows a course running roughly north–south for 100 kilometers.

Satellite craters
By convention these features are identified on lunar maps by placing the letter on the side of the crater midpoint that is closest to Milichius.

References

External links

Impact craters on the Moon